Susie De Los Santos (born November 6, 1988) is a model of Dominican and Mexican descent. De Los Santos is from Corona, Queens, New York. She later began a career in modeling.

Achievements
In 2007, De Los Santos won the Miss North Carolina Hawaiian Tropic pageant and went on to compete in the United States Miss Hawaiian Tropic finals in Hawaii. Later that year, she hosted a weekly entertainment segment for North Carolina's Univision 40 called Muévete Carolina. She also auditioned for America's Next Top Model and did not even make it to the top house.

In December 2009, De Los Santos won Miss Dominican Republic for Fox Sports en Español's Premios Fox Sports out of over 50 contestants nationwide. She has done promotions for Eurosport, Compare Foods and Wendy's. In 2010, De Los Santos won Model Of The Year in the Carolina Music Awards. Later that year, she won a national model search featured on Telefutura's Escandalo TV "Buscando la Modelo del Chapo de Sinaloa." In 2011 she appeared alongside El Chapo de Sinaloa as the lead model in his music video, "Embrujado."

In 2010 De Los Santos won model of the year in the Carolina Music Awards.

Nuestra Belleza Latina

Nuestra Belleza Latina 2009
In 2009, De Los Santos auditioned for Univision's Nuestra Belleza Latina. Out of thousands of models, she was selected as a finalist and to date she is the only girl from North Carolina to have made it to the top 12. She was on the show for two months before she was eliminated. Susie gained international exposure and some degree of fame through her participation. Susie has been interviewed on various occasions on Univision shows including, Don Francisco Presenta, Despierta America and El Gordo y La Flaca.

NBL VIP "All★Star"- Nuestra Belleza Latina 2016 
Susie De Los Santos has been chosen by producers to compete in the first ever "All★Star" season of Nuestra Belleza Latina, The season of Nuestra Belleza Latina 2016 will premiere on Sunday February 28, 2016. Susie was eliminated from the competition on 3/13/16 as the judge Osmel Souza said that her performance was worse than when she first auditioned in 2009

Personal
Susie is the owner of her own beauty pageant and magazine called Nuestra Belleza Carolina and is C.E.O. of DLS Premiere. She is part owner of Susie Taxi, a taxicab company in Durham, North Carolina. 

Susie is signed to Elite Miami.

References

1988 births
Living people
Beauty pageant contestants from North Carolina